Lucas Persson (born 16 March 1984) is a Swedish cyclist.

Palmares
2004
 National Team Time Trial Champion
2005
1st Scandinavian Race Uppsala
2006
1st Scandinavian Race Uppsala
3rd National Road Race Championships
2007
1st Stage 2 Triptyque Ardennais
1st Scandinavian Open Road Race
2nd Circuito Montañés
3rd National Time Trial Championships

References 

1984 births
Living people
Swedish male cyclists